Ivana Emilova Naydenova (born 21 December 2001) is a Bulgarian footballer who plays as a midfielder for Women's National Championship club FC NSA Sofia and the Bulgaria women's national team.

International career
Naydenova capped for Bulgaria at senior level in a 0–6 friendly loss to Croatia on 14 June 2019.

International goals

References

2001 births
Living people
Footballers from Sofia
Bulgarian women's footballers
Women's association football midfielders
FC NSA Sofia players
Bulgaria women's international footballers